A claim chart is a widely used device in patent infringement litigation. It is a convenient and effective means for analyzing and presenting information regarding a patent claim. In each, typically, there are two columns: the left column contains the language of the patent claim under analysis, separated into the successive limitations (e.g., elements or steps, integers, parts) of the claim; the right column contains the information relating to the claim element at its left.

Types

There are three principal types of claim chart:
 A chart of references (such earlier patents and magazine articles) that allegedly show the invalidity of the patent because of anticipation or obviousness). (This would be a chart prepared by the defendant or party accused of infringing the patent.)
 An infringement chart that allegedly shows how the product or process accused of infringement contains each claim element, thereby satisfying the all elements test for infringement. (This would be a chart prepared by the plaintiff or patent owner.)
 Less commonly, a claim interpretation chart that shows, for each claim element, passages in the patent specification or in technical literature that show the proper meaning or interpretation that should be given to the language of the claim. (Either party might prepare this chart.)

Other claim chart types include initial or preliminary infringement contentions (PICs); domestic industry (DI) charts employed in International Trade Commission (ITC) importation actions; expert claim charts; "parts list" charts used for example as demonstrative exhibits; claim charts presented during licensing or settlement negotiations; and design patent charts.

Illustrative example

The following illustrative chart of references to show the invalidity of a hypothetical patent is based on a chart that was prepared by the US Patent and Trademark Office (PTO) and is found in its Manual of Patent Examining Procedure (MPEP), § 2214:

Patentable subject matter chart
Claim charts may also be used to support an argument that a patent claims ineligible subject matter, such as a law of nature or a conventional business practice. The left column of this type of chart is the same as that of the claim charts described above. In the right column, the steps or elements of a well known business concept or a way of organizing human activity are listed. The purpose is to show that the claimed process or system is well known with the addition only of "do it with a computer" (or something similar). Under the Supreme Court's decision in Alice v. CLS Bank such a patent claim is usually invalidated as a mere abstract idea (unless implemented in an inventive manner).

An example of such a table appears in the defendant's briefs in Walker Digital, LLC v. Google, Inc. The court said that the chart showed: "As the following hypothetical [case] (articulated by Google, and not meaningfully distinguished by Walker) shows, these steps can and routinely are performed by, for example, human job headhunters." This is the chart from the Walker Digital case:

As a result of its review of the chart, the Walker Digital court concluded:
Even after carefully reviewing the parties’ briefs and the patents, and questioning the parties about Google’s hypothetical at the hearing, the Court is unable to discern any reason why, in Google’s hypothetical, Carol would not be liable for infringement of Walker’s ’270 patent. Based on the undisputed evidence, and drawing all reasonable inferences in Walker’s favor, the Court concludes that every step of claim 1 of the ’270 patent is performed in Google’s routine headhunting hypothetical. It follows that all the steps of the ’270 patent are routine and []conventional. To allow the claim to survive would disproportionately risk preempting a building block of human interaction, retarding rather than promoting progress, contrary to the very purpose patents are granted.

The court thereafter held the patent invalid.

References

Patent law